General elections were held in Kenya on 29 December 1997 to elect the President and the members of the National Assembly. The result was a victory for the ruling Kenya African National Union, which won 107 of the 210 seats in the National Assembly, and whose candidate Daniel arap Moi won the presidential election. Following the election, Moi appointed a further 12 members to the Assembly.

Results

President

By province

National Assembly

Of the 12 appointed members, six were representatives of KANU, two from the Democratic Party, and one each from the National Development Party, FORD–Kenya, the Social Democratic Party and Safina.

Aftermath
In 1998 Mwai Kibaki took a petition against Moi to court, having served Moi by publishing the notice of the petition in the Kenya Gazette. However, judges Emmanuel O'Kubasu, Mbogholi Msagha and Moijo ole Keiwua ruled that Kibaki should have served Moi with the petition personally. Their position was upheld at the Court of Appeal by judges Omolo, Bernard Chunga (Chief Justice), AB Shah, AA Lakha and Owuor JJ.

References

External links
Kenya: candidates and issues BBC News

Elections in Kenya
General
Kenya
National Assembly (Kenya)
Presidential elections in Kenya
Election and referendum articles with incomplete results